Carlos Smith (born 11 April 1969) is a Bahamian football player. He has played for Bahamas national team.

References

External links

1969 births
Living people
Association football goalkeepers
Bahamian footballers
Bahamas international footballers